Fordia is a genus of flowering plant in the family Fabaceae, native from south China and Thailand to west and central Malesia.  The genus was established by William Hemsley in 1886.

Species
, Plants of the World Online accepted the following species:

Fordia brachybotrys Merr.
Fordia cauliflora Hemsl.
Fordia fruticosa Craib
Fordia johorensis Whitmore
Fordia lanceolata Ridl.
Fordia ophirensis Ridl.
Fordia pauciflora Dunn
Fordia rheophytica (Buijsen) Dasuki & Schot
Fordia splendidissima (Blume ex Miq.) Buijsen
Fordia stipularis (Prain) Dunn

Former species:
 Fordia incredibilis → Imbralyx incredibilis

References 

Millettieae
Taxonomy articles created by Polbot
Fabaceae genera
Fabales of Asia